Lauren Alvarado (born 26 March 1988) is an English singer/actress who performs under the stage name "Lauren Samuels". She became well known to the British public as a contestant on the 2010 BBC UK TV series Over the Rainbow. Since appearing on the show, she has gone on to appear in West End theatre, including playing the lead role of Sandy in Grease.

Background
Samuels married David Alvarado in 2021, her maiden name is Lauren Bonner but she adopted the stage name Lauren Samuels for her elder brother, Samuel. 
She started ballet lessons at age two, began private tutorials at the Hinckley Speech and Drama Studio at seven and started singing lessons at thirteen. She studied Performing Arts at Stratford-upon-Avon College, was a member of Youth Music Theatre UK in 2005  and also studied at the Guildford School of Acting, graduating in 2009.

Over the Rainbow

Samuels was a contestant on the 2010 BBC show Over the Rainbow: a talent contest to find an actress to play Dorothy in a West End revival of The Wizard of Oz. Samuels made it through to the final eleven girls who would compete for the public vote through individual performances. Despite coming in the bottom two for votes on three occasions, Samuels made it through to the final, where she ultimately came third to runner-up Sophie Evans and winner Danielle Hope.

Solo performances

Discography
Samuels, along with the other two finalists of Over the Rainbow, recorded a version of "Over the Rainbow" with the intention of the eventual winner's song being made available for purchase shortly after the finale. Hope's recording was originally the only version released, but both Evans' and Samuels' versions of the song were ultimately made available for download on 6 June 2010. She also appeared with the other contestants in a Wizard of Oz medley featured as a b-side on the CD single of Hope's "Over the Rainbow."
Samuels also recorded "Someone You'd Be Proud Of" for the concept album of "The In-Between". The album was released in early 2012.
In 2017 she recorded two songs for the album Wit & Whimsy - Songs by Alexander S. Bermange (one solo and one featuring all of the album's 23 artists), which reached No. 1 in the iTunes comedy album chart.

In 2021, Samuels, alongside former Over the Rainbow finalist Sophie Evans, recorded and released a joint album entitled 'Chasing Rainbows, Finding Judy', which is dedicated to celebrating the life of Judy Garland.

In 2022, Samuels began hosting her own podcast entitled 'A Brit in LA', which sees her interviewing successful people throughout the Hollywood entertainment industry.

Stage
Samuels' first major stage role was playing Wendy in a 2009-2010 production of Peter Pan at the Curve, Leicester.

On 26 July 2010, she made her West End debut as Sandy in the London production of Grease, replacing Siobhan Dillon. She played Cathy in a production of the two-character musical The Last Five Years, which ran at the Tabard Theatre, Chiswick from 9 February to 5 March 2011.

Samuels played the role of Scaramouche in We Will Rock You at the Dominion Theatre in London from late 2011. Following this she starred as the title character in Vampirette the Musical at the Manchester Opera House in May 2012. She reprised her role in  We Will Rock You for its 10th anniversary tour, which commenced on 25 February 2012

In June 2015, Samuels began playing the role of Jules, in the new West End musical Bend It Like Beckham.

Stage Credits

2021-22 || Groan Ups || Katie || Mischief Theatre || UK Tour

References

External links
 
 
 

Living people
1988 births
Alumni of British Youth Music Theatre